Vincenzo Rubolotta (born 1913, date of death unknown) was an Italian rower. He competed in the men's eight event at the 1956 Summer Olympics.

References

1913 births
Year of death missing
Italian male rowers
Olympic rowers of Italy
Rowers at the 1956 Summer Olympics
Place of birth missing